Mari Gwendoline Ellis (born Mary Gwendoline Headley, 21 July 1913 – 25 January 2015), was a Welsh writer and women's rights activist.

Life 
She was born in Dylife, Montgomeryshire, the daughter of the Reverend Richard Llewelyn Headley.  She graduated BA Hons in Welsh in 1936 at the then University College of North Wales, and MA in 1938.  Having worked at various public libraries in both Wales and England, in 1944 she was  appointed to the National Library of Wales, Aberystwyth.  She married Thomas Iorwerth Ellis in 1949.  Their daughter is the writer Meg Ann Elis.  She edited 'Tŷ Ni', a woman's section of the Welsh-language newspaper Y Cymro for nine years, and published Ffenest y Gegin in 1965.  She also had a column in Y Llan for many years.

Works 
 Ffenest y Gegin    1965
 Y Golau Gwan - the love letters of T. E. Ellis

References

1913 births
2015 deaths
Welsh centenarians
Welsh feminists
Welsh writers
Women centenarians